Zebron Kalima (born 13 May 2002) is a Malawian professional footballer who plays as a winger for the Malawian club Silver Strikers, and the Malawi national team.

International career
Kalima made his international debut with the Malawi national team in a 2–1 friendly win over Comoros on 31 December 2021. He was part of the Malawi squad the 2021 Africa Cup of Nations.

References

External links
 

2002 births
Living people
People from Lilongwe
Malawian footballers
Malawi international footballers
Association football wingers
2021 Africa Cup of Nations players